April Mary Scott McMahon  (born 30 April 1964) is a British academic administrator and linguist, who is Vice President for Teaching, Learning and Students at the University of Manchester.

Having taught at the University of Cambridge and the University of Sheffield, she moved into academic administration while teaching at the University of Edinburgh. She was vice-chancellor of the Aberystwyth University (2011–2016), then a member of the senior leadership team at the University of Kent before joining the University of Manchester.

Early life and education
McMahon was born on 30 April 1964 in Edinburgh, Scotland. She grew up in the Scottish Borders. She studied at the University of Edinburgh, graduating with an undergraduate Master of Arts (MA Hons) degree in 1986. She remained to study for a Doctor of Philosophy (PhD) degree in phonology, which was awarded in 1989 with a doctoral thesis titled "Constraining lexical phonology: evidence from English vowels".

Career
McMahon began her career at the University of Cambridge, where she was a lecturer in linguistics and a fellow of Selwyn College, Cambridge, from 1988 to 2000. From 2000 to 2004, she was Professor of English Language and Linguistics at the University of Sheffield. She then joined the University of Edinburgh, where she was Forbes Professor of English Language from 2005 to 2011. She was additionally Head of the School of Philosophy, Psychology and Language Sciences, then Head of the College of Humanities and Social Science, and finally its vice-principal (planning and research planning) from 2009 to 2011.

In 2011, McMahon joined Aberystwyth University as vice-chancellor, the chief executive and academic head of the university. Her salary at Aberystwyth was £237,000, and she when she left the university, she received an extra payment of £102,000. In 2016, she joined the University of Kent as deputy vice-chancellor (education) and Professor of English Language and Linguistics. She moved once again, joining the University of Manchester as vice-president for teaching, learning and students in 2019.

Awards and honours
In 2003, McMahon was elected a Fellow of the Royal Society of Edinburgh (FRSE). In 2005, she was elected a Fellow of the British Academy (FBA), the United Kingdom's national academy for the humanities and social sciences. In 2012, she was elected a Fellow of the Learned Society of Wales (FLSW).

Personal life
McMahon married Robert McMahon in 1984 and has two sons and one daughter.

Selected works
Her publications as first author or co-author / editor include:

References

 

 
 
 

1964 births
Living people
Linguists from the United Kingdom
Women linguists
20th-century linguists
21st-century linguists
Historical linguists
Fellows of the Royal Society of Edinburgh
Fellows of the British Academy
Fellows of the Learned Society of Wales
Vice-Chancellors of Aberystwyth University
Fellows of Selwyn College, Cambridge
Academics of the University of Sheffield
British academic administrators
Academics of the University of Edinburgh
Academics of the University of Kent
Academics of the University of Manchester